The women's 200 metre breaststroke was a swimming event held as part of the swimming at the 1932 Summer Olympics programme. It was the third appearance of the event, which was established in 1924. The competition was held on Saturday August 6, 1932 and on Tuesday August 9, 1932.

Eleven swimmers from seven nations competed.

Medalists

Records
These were the standing world and Olympic records (in minutes) prior to the 1932 Summer Olympics.

In the first semi-final Clare Dennis set a new Olympic record with 3:08.2 minutes. In the final she bettered this record with 3:06.3 minutes.

Results

Semifinals

Saturday August 6, 1932: The fastest two in each semi-final and the fastest third-placed from across the semi-finals advanced to the final.

Semifinal 1

Semifinal 2

Semifinal 3

Final

Tuesday August 9, 1932:

References

External links
Olympic Report
 

Swimming at the 1932 Summer Olympics
1932 in women's swimming
Swim